John William Wadsworth (1879–1955) was a British ceramicist.

After studying at the Royal College of Art, he began his career at the Mintons company in Stoke-on-Trent, where he collaborated closely with Léon-Victor Solon on art nouveau designs. These products were marketed as "secessionist ware" in a reference to the Vienna Secession art movement.

He emigrated to the United States in 1901.

He moved to the Royal Worcester Porcelain Company as Art Director in 1915.

He was the father of the potter Philip Wadsworth, born in Stoke-on-Trent in 1910.

References

Further reading
Phillips. London, 8 April 1992,"The Ceramic Art and Paintings of John and Philip Wadsworth". 
J. Jones, Minton. The First Two Hundred Years of Design & Production, Shrewsbury, 1993, pp. 242–53.

British ceramicists
British emigrants to the United States
1879 births
1955 deaths